Nocturnal Breed is a Norwegian thrash metal band, formed in Oslo in 1996 by singer/bassist Kenneth Svartalv (S.A. Destroyer) and guitarist Sven Atle Kopperud (Ed Damnator).

Members
S.A. Destroyer (Kenneth Svartalv): vocals/bass (1996–)
I. Maztor: Lead guitar (1997–2001/ 2011–present)
Tex Terror: drums/vocals (1998–)
V. Fineideath: guitars (2011–)

Former members
Andy Michaels: drums (1997)
Bitch Molester (Stian Tomt Thoresen): session keyboards (1996–1997)
Astennu (Jamie Stinson): session guitars (1997)
Tjodalv (Ian Kenneth Akesson): session drums (1997)
Rick Hellraiser (Stian Andre Hinderson): session/live drums (1997)
Ed Damnator (Sven Atle Kopperud): guitars (1996–1998)
I. Maztor: guitars (1997–2001)
Thrawn (Tom Kvalsvoll): guitars (2002–2005)
Ben Hellion: guitars/vocals (1998–2011) (died 2022)
A.E. Rattlehead (Atle Egil Knoff Glomstad): guitars/vocals (2006–2011)

Timeline

Discography
Aggressor (1997)
Triumph Of The Blasphemer EP (1998)
No Retreat...No Surrender (1999)
Tools of the Trade (2000)
Warthog - 7-inch EP, Prostata Records (Ltd. 500) (2004)
Motörmouth - 7-inch EP, Neseblod Records (Ltd. 100 Yellow vinyl / Ltd. 400 black vinyl) (2004)
Überthrash - 7-inch Split, Duplicate Records (Split w. Audiopain / Aura Noir / Infernö, Ltd. 500) (2004)
Überthrash II - 7-inch Split, Duplicate Records (Split w. Audiopain / Aura Noir / Infernö) (2005)
Remasters - 5-piece Boxset, Painkiller Records (Ltd. 1000) (2005)
Fields of Rot - LP, Agonia Records (2007)
Napalm Nights - LP, Agonia Records (2014)
We Only Came for the Violence - LP, Folter Records (2019)

References

 Nocturnal Breed on Encyclopedia Metallum

External links
 Official site
 Official MySpace page

Norwegian thrash metal musical groups
Musical groups established in 1996
1996 establishments in Norway
Musical groups from Oslo